Tsi-Tsi-Ki Félix is a nationally known broadcaster, currently leading the daily news and a Sunday political talk show on Entravision.  Formerly she was the lead anchor of Telemundo Chicago's WSNS-TV 5 p.m. and 10 p.m. news broadcasts.

Biography 

Félix is a native of Michoacán, Mexico and a graduate of DePaul University in Chicago, Illinois.

Félix led Telemundo Chicago’s coverage of the historic 2008 presidential election. She anchored coverage of the political conventions, Election Night, and the Inauguration for the Chicago viewers. Over the course of the country’s 2010 mid-term campaign and election, she conducted wide-ranging interviews with political and civic leaders to reveal how the candidates and the election would potentially impact local Hispanic communities and its citizens.

Félix's anchoring and reporting has been recognized with numerous awards, including the Emmy for her on-camera achievements. She has also served as a local correspondent for Noticiero Telemundo, the national nightly newscast and programs such as "Todobebe," "Hoy," and "Cotorreando".

Félix joined Telemundo Chicago in 2001 as a fill in reporter and anchor for Milenka Peña, a veteran journalist and public figure. The following year she became the station's weather anchor. In addition she provided entertainment and feature reporting for Chicago’s #2 Spanish TV station. In short order, due to the unexpected departure of the news anchors, she was named co-anchor of Telemundo Chicago’s 5 p.m. news and given responsibility for producing and anchoring the morning briefs "Noticiero Telemundo Chicago por la Manaña" that drew record ratings for this time period. She held both these posts until the reporter and community activist Vicente Serrano, then the main anchor, was fired and she was named solo anchor of the 10 p.m. news for Telemundo Chicago.

In 2010 Félix hosted "The Feminine Edge:  You Don't Have to be One of the 'Boys' to Succeed" at The Executives' Club of Chicago

She was previously married to Rafael Romo, the former WBBM-TV and WGBO-TV reporter/anchor, who currently works for CNN. He is credited for getting Félix her start in Chicago television news. The two have since divorced.

Prior to joining Telemundo, Félix worked in radio, reading traffic reports early mornings. She began her career in Phoenix, Arizona at the age of 16 and moved on to Chicago radio stations WOJO and WIND where she helped with the production of daily content. Her work in this capacity earned a variety of honors, including the AIR (Achievement in Radio Awards) for Best Spanish News Presentation in Radio.

Félix became the prominent news anchor for Univision Washington, DC on March 3, 2015. She also is the host of Perspectiva Nacional.

Television programs
 Abriendo Puertas (host) 
 Noticiero Telemundo Chicago por la Manaña
 Noticero Telemundo Chicago (anchor, 2007-2012)
 Hablando Claro (host, 2010-?)
 Perspectiva Nacional

References

External links

 Gracie, Ivy. (May 2008), In the Spotlight- Tsi-tsi-ki Felix. Today's Chicago Woman Magazine
 "Origins students come to DePaul for presentations", The DePaulia, May 16, 2011
 Brian Williams talks to Tsi-tsi-ki Felix about latinos in the USA
 https://www.youtube.com/watch?v=2cn8qwCK93g
 Mexicanos en el extranjero: Tsi-Tsi-Ki Félix e Iselle Campos, EUA (Programa 17) at YouTube channel CanalOnceIPN
 https://www.youtube.com/watch?v=V0RY6SqhT-o

Television anchors from Chicago
Living people
People from Michoacán
Univision people
1979 births